In a thought experiment proposed by the Italian probabilist Bruno de Finetti in order to justify Bayesian probability, an array of wagers is coherent precisely if it does not expose the wagerer to certain loss regardless of the outcomes of events on which they are wagering, even if their opponent makes the most judicious choices.

Operational subjective probabilities as wagering odds

One must set the price of a promise to pay $1 if John Smith wins tomorrow's election, and $0 otherwise.  One knows that one's opponent will be able to choose either to buy such a promise from one at the price one has set, or require one to buy such a promise from them, still at the same price.  In other words: Player A sets the odds, but Player B decides which side of the bet to take.  The price one sets is the "operational subjective probability" that one assigns to the proposition on which one is betting.

If one decides that John Smith is 12.5% likely to win—an arbitrary valuation—one might then set an odds of 7:1 against. This arbitrary valuation — the "operational subjective probability" — determines the payoff to a successful wager. $1 wagered at these odds will produce either a loss of $1 (if Smith loses) or a win of $7 (if Smith wins). If the $1 is placed in pledge as a condition of the bet, then the $1 will also be returned to the bettor, should the bettor win the bet.

Dutch books

A person who has set prices on an array of wagers, in such a way that he or she will make a net gain regardless of the outcome, is said to have made a Dutch book. When one has a Dutch book, one's opponent always loses. A person who sets prices in a way that gives his or her opponent a Dutch book is not behaving rationally. So the following Dutch book arguments show that rational agents must hold subjective probabilities that follow the common laws of probability.

A very trivial Dutch book

The rules do not forbid a set price higher than $1, but a prudent opponent may sell one a high-priced ticket, such that the opponent comes out ahead regardless of the outcome of the event on which the bet is made.  The rules also do not forbid a negative price, but an opponent may extract a paid promise from the bettor to pay him or her later should a certain contingency arise.  In either case, the price-setter loses.  These lose-lose situations parallel the fact that a probability can neither exceed 1 (certainty) nor be less than 0 (no chance of winning).

A more instructive Dutch book

Now suppose one sets the price of a promise to pay $1 if the Boston Red Sox win next year's World Series, and also the price of a promise to pay $1 if the New York Yankees win, and finally the price of a promise to pay $1 if either the Red Sox or the Yankees win.  One may set the prices in such a way that

But if one sets the price of the third ticket lower than the sum of the first two tickets, a prudent opponent will buy that ticket and sell the other two tickets to the price-setter.  By considering the three possible outcomes (Red Sox, Yankees, some other team), one will note that regardless of which of the three outcomes eventuates, one will lose.  An analogous fate awaits if one set the price of the third ticket higher than the sum of the other two prices.  This parallels the fact that probabilities of mutually exclusive events are additive (see probability axioms).

Conditional wagers and conditional probabilities

Now imagine a more complicated scenario.  One must set the prices of three promises:

to pay $1 if the Red Sox win tomorrow's game: the purchaser of this promise loses their bet if the Red Sox do not win regardless of whether their failure is due to their loss of a completed game or cancellation of the game, and
to pay $1 if the Red Sox win, and to refund the price of the promise if the game is cancelled, and
to pay $1 if the game is completed, regardless of who wins.

Three outcomes are possible: The game is cancelled; the game is played and the Red Sox lose; the game is played and the Red Sox win.  One may set the prices in such a way that

(where the second price above is that of the bet that includes the refund in case of cancellation). (Note: The prices here are the dimensionless numbers obtained by dividing by $1, which is the payout in all three cases.) A prudent opponent writes three linear inequalities in three variables.  The variables are the amounts they will invest in each of the three promises; the value of one of these is negative if they will make the price-setter buy that promise and positive if they will buy it.  Each inequality corresponds to one of the three possible outcomes.  Each inequality states that your opponent's net gain is more than zero.  A solution exists if the determinant of the matrix is not zero. That determinant is:

Thus a prudent opponent can make the price setter a sure loser unless one sets one's prices in a way that parallels the simplest conventional characterization of conditional probability.

Another example 

In the 2015 running of the Kentucky Derby, the favorite ("American Pharaoh") was set ante-post at 5:2, the second favorite at 3:1, and the third favorite at 8:1. All other horses had odds against of 12:1 or higher. With these odds, a wager of $10 on each of all 18 starters would result in a net loss if either the favorite or the second favorite were to win.

However, if one assumes that no horse quoted 12:1 or higher will win, and one bets $10 on each of the top three, one is guaranteed at least a small win. The favorite (who did win) would result in a payout of $25, plus the returned $10 wager, giving an ending balance of $35 (a $5 net increase). A win by the second favorite would produce a payoff of $30 plus the original $10 wager, for a net $10 increase. A win by the third favorite gives $80 plus the original $10, for a net increase of $60.

This sort of strategy, so far as it concerns just the top three, forms a Dutch Book. However, if one considers all eighteen contenders, then no Dutch Book exists for this race.

Coherence 

It can be shown that the set of prices is coherent when they satisfy the probability axioms and related results such as the inclusion–exclusion principle (but not necessarily countable additivity).

See also
 , analogous concept in mathematical finance
 Bayesian epistemology
 
 Scoring rule

References

External links
"Bayesian Epistemology"

Thought experiments
Conditional probability
Wagering